The Cat CT660 is a Class 8 vocational truck sold by Caterpillar Inc. which represents a diversification of the company's product line into the on-highway trucking industry. Available at Cat dealers from summer 2011, the truck is offered with a CAT 11 liter CT11 and 13 liter CT13 and is built at Navistar International’s factory in Garland, Texas.

CT660s are sold and serviced by Cat dealers only.

As of March 2016, Caterpillar has ceased production of on-highway vocational trucks stating that “Remaining a viable competitor in this market would require significant additional investment to develop and launch a complete portfolio of trucks, and upon an updated review, we determined there was not a sufficient market opportunity to justify the investment,” said Ramin Younessi, vice president with responsibility for Caterpillar's Industrial Power Systems Division. “We have not yet started truck production in Victoria, and this decision allows us to exit this business before the transition occurs.”

Specifications

Chassis
Set-Back Axle (SBA), 116-inch and 122-inch Bumper to Back of Cab (BBC) available
Durable, heat-treated alloy steel frame rails
12.0-inch rail size: 110,000 and 120,000 psi yield strength
Length variable in 2.0-inch increments
Available with rail reinforcements: one or two frame reinforcements available

Axles
Meritor, Dana and Fabco options available

Suspension
Front:
Multileaf, shackle type, single or two-stage spring
Multileaf, slipper type
Compatible shock absorber selection
Rear:
Hendrickson suspension offerings: HaulMaax, HN, RT/RTE, RS, R, PriMaax
Chalmers high articulation

Fuel tanks
Fuel tanks available in 60, 80, 100 and 120 gallon capacities
Single left, single right or dual options available
Aluminum alloy construction

Notes

Sources

Cat CT660 as taken by Wayne Crane (Hank's Truck Pictures)

Caterpillar Inc. trucks